Viscount Grandison, of Limerick, is a title in the Peerage of Ireland. It was created in 1620 for Sir Oliver St John, the Lord Deputy of Ireland. He was the descendant and namesake of Oliver St John, whose elder brother Sir John St John was the ancestor of the Barons St John of Bletso and the Earls of Bolingbroke. Moreover, St John's nephew Sir John St John, 1st Baronet, of Lydiard Tregoze, was the ancestor of the Viscounts Bolingbroke and the Viscounts St John.

At the time of its creation in 1620, the Grandison viscountcy was given special remainder to the male issue of his niece Barbara Villiers. She was the wife of Sir Edward Villiers, the elder half-brother of George Villiers, 1st Duke of Buckingham, Christopher Villiers, 1st Earl of Anglesey and John Villiers, 1st Viscount Purbeck.

In 1626 the 1st Viscount Grandison was also created Baron Tregoz in the Peerage of England, with normal remainder to the heirs male of his body. On his death in 1630 the barony of Tregoz became extinct as he left no male heirs. He was succeeded in the viscountcy according to the special remainder by William Villiers, the eldest son of Barbara and Sir Edward Villiers. William Villiers, 2nd Viscount Grandison (1614–1643) was a supporter of King Charles I and died of wounds received at the Battle of Bristol in 1643. His daughter the Hon. Barbara Villiers, became the mistress of King Charles II and was created Duchess of Cleveland in 1670.

The second Viscount Grandison had had no sons and was succeeded in the viscountcy by his younger brother, the third Viscount. He died childless and was succeeded by his younger brother, the fourth Viscount. On his death the title passed to his grandson, the fifth Viscount. He was the son of Brigadier-General the Hon. Edward Villiers (died 1693), eldest son of the fourth Viscount. In 1721 the fifth Viscount was created Earl Grandison in the Peerage of Ireland. However, he left no surviving male heirs and the earldom became extinct on his death, while he was succeeded in the Grandison viscountcy by his second cousin William Villiers, 3rd Earl of Jersey, who became the sixth Viscount. Lord Jersey was the great-grandson of Sir Edward Villiers, fifth son of Barbara and Sir Edward Villiers. See the Earl of Jersey for further history of the viscountcy.

In 1746 Elizabeth Mason, daughter of John Villiers, 1st Earl Grandison, was created Viscountess Grandison, and in 1767 she was made Viscountess Villiers and Countess Grandison. All three titles were in the Peerage of Ireland. However, they became extinct on the death of the second Earl in 1800.

Viscounts Grandison; First creation (1620)
Oliver St John, 1st Viscount Grandison (–1630)
William Villiers, 2nd Viscount Grandison (1614–1643)
John Villiers, 3rd Viscount Grandison (died )
George Villiers, 4th Viscount Grandison (–1699) (maternal grandfather of Pitt the Elder)
John Villiers, 5th Viscount Grandison (1692–1766) (created Earl Grandison in 1721)

Earls Grandison; First creation (1721)

John Villiers, 1st Earl Grandison, 5th Viscount Grandison (1692–1766)
James Villiers, Lord Villiers (died 1732)
William Villiers, Lord Villiers (1715–1739)

Viscounts Grandison; First creation (1620; Reverted)
William Villiers, 3rd Earl of Jersey, 6th Viscount Grandison (died 1769)
See Earl of Jersey for further Viscounts Grandison

Earls Grandison; Second Creation (1767)
Elizabeth Mason, 1st Countess Grandison (died 1782)
George Mason-Villiers, 2nd Earl Grandison (1751–1800)

Notes

References
Kidd, Charles, Williamson, David (editors). Debrett's Peerage and Baronetage (1990 edition). New York: St Martin's Press, 1990, 

 
1620 establishments in Ireland

Peerages created with special remainders
Extinct viscountcies in the Peerage of Ireland
Noble titles created in 1620
Noble titles created in 1746
Grandison